Kerehikapa is an island in the Solomon Islands; it is located in Isabel Province. It is part of the Marine Protected Area of Arnarvon Islands.

Internet
On February 1, 2011, a VSAT broadband Internet system was installed at the permanent conservation office on Kerihikapa.

Fauna
Dobsonia inermis
Macroglossus minimus
Nyctimene major
Pteropus woodfordi
Pipistrellus papuanus

References

Islands of the Solomon Islands